Fauna Svecica ("Fauna of Sweden", ed. 1, Stockholm, 1746; ed. 2 Stockholm, 1761) was written by Swedish botanist, physician, zoologist and naturalist Carl Linnaeus (1707–1778).

This was the first full account of the animals in Sweden. The full title of the publication was Fauna Svecica: sistens animalia Sveciæ regni: qvadrupedia, aves, amphibia, pisces, insecta, vermes, distributa per classes & ordines, genera & species. Cum differentiis specierum, synonymis autorum, nominibus incolarum, locis habitationum, descriptionibus insectorum.

Fauna Svecica, ed. 2, 1761, is currently under translation to English.

References

External links

Carl Linnaeus
Zoological literature
1746 books
18th-century Latin books